Lugano-Paradiso railway station is a railway station in the municipality of Paradiso in the Swiss canton of Ticino. The station is on the Gotthard railway of the Swiss Federal Railways, between Lugano and Chiasso. The station opened in 1945 and was renovated in 2018.

Services 
 the following services stop at Lugano-Paradiso:

The Monte San Salvatore funicular crosses above Lugano-Paradiso railway station on a bridge. Its lower terminal is some  walk to the north of the station.

Urban bus route 1 of the Trasporti Pubblici Luganesi (TPL) serves a stop on the south side of the station, as do regional buses of the AutoPostale to Agnuzzo, Bissone, Carabietta and Morcote.

Gallery

Notes

References

External links 
 
 

Lugano-Paradiso
Lugano-Paradiso
Railway stations in Switzerland opened in 1945